was a Japanese novelist, playwright, politician and central committee member of the Japanese Communist Party from 1950 to 1951.

Takakura graduated from Kyoto Imperial University and was a left-wing thinker of the Kyoto School. He was arrested several times under the Public Security Preservation Laws prior to the Allied occupation of Japan. In 1945 he fled parole to attend a funeral and was arrested along with Miki Kiyoshi, who he had gone to for clothes and money. This would inevitably lead to Miki's death in prison. Takakura however, following his release at the hands of the Allied Occupation, went on to become a politician for the Japanese Communist Party in the early 1950s.

References

Sources 

 

1891 births
1986 deaths
20th-century Japanese dramatists and playwrights
20th-century Japanese novelists
Japanese Communist Party politicians
Kyoto School
Kyoto University alumni
People from Kōchi Prefecture